Paul James McCullough (born 26 October 1959) is an English retired professional footballer who played in the Football League for Brentford as a goalkeeper.

Career statistics

References

1959 births
Footballers from Birmingham, West Midlands
English footballers
Association football goalkeepers
English Football League players
Brentford F.C. players
Reading F.C. players
Dawlish United F.C. players
Mjällby AIF players
Western Football League players
English expatriate footballers
English expatriate sportspeople in Sweden
Expatriate footballers in Sweden
Living people